Liopinus alpha is a species of beetle in the family Cerambycidae. It was described by Say in 1827.

References

Acanthocinini
Beetles described in 1827